The 1962 Jacksonville State Gamecocks football team represented Jacksonville State College (now known as Jacksonville State University) as a member of the Alabama Collegiate Conference (ACC) during the 1962 NAIA football season. Led by 16th-year head coach Don Salls, the Gamecocks compiled an overall record of 4–3–2 with a mark of 2–0–1 in conference play, and finished as ACC co-champion.

Schedule

References

Jacksonville State
Jacksonville State Gamecocks football seasons
Alabama Collegiate Conference football champion seasons
Jacksonville State Gamecocks football